Ministry of Foreign Affairs and Expatriates may refer to:

 Ministry of Foreign Affairs and Expatriates (Jordan)
 Ministry of Foreign Affairs and Expatriates (Syria)
 Ministry of Foreign Affairs and Expatriates (State of Palestine)